Marquelia  is one of the 81 municipalities of Guerrero, in south-western Mexico. The municipal seat lies at Marquelia.  

As of 2005, the municipality had a total population of 11,801.

References

Municipalities of Guerrero